Brock Island is one of the uninhabited members of the Queen Elizabeth Islands of the Arctic Archipelago located in the Northwest Territories, Canada. Located at 77°51'N 114°27'W, it measures  in size and lies close to Mackenzie King Island. The first known sighting of the island by a European was by Vilhjalmur Stefansson in 1915 and it was later named for Reginald W. Brock, Dean of Applied Science at the University of British Columbia.

References

External links
Brock Island in the Atlas of Canada - Toporama; Natural Resources Canada

Islands of the Queen Elizabeth Islands
Uninhabited islands of the Northwest Territories